Max Gawn (born 30 December 1991) is a professional Australian rules footballer playing for the Melbourne Football Club in the Australian Football League (AFL). A ruckman, 209 cm tall and weighing 111 kg, Gawn is capable of contributing in both the ruck and forward line. A basketballer and rugby union player at a young age, he pursued his career in Australian rules football and was drafted to the Melbourne Football Club with the thirty-fourth selection in the 2009 AFL draft. He made his AFL debut in the 2011 AFL season. Knee and hamstring injuries hampered his first four seasons in the AFL before he moved into the number-one ruck position at Melbourne in 2015 along with selection for the 2016 All-Australian team. Gawn was named as Melbourne's captain at the start of the 2020 AFL season, and in 2021 led the club to its first premiership since 1964.

Early life
Born in Australia to parents Sandra (of New Zealand) and Robert (of New Zealand, and former South Island rugby representative player) who migrated to Australia as young adults they moved Max to Greymouth on the South Island of New Zealand at the age of 3. A few years later, his parents settled permanently in Melbourne. Following his father's recommendation, he played rugby union in Under-10s for Powerhouse RUFC in Albert Park, Victoria. He also played basketball as a junior. Australian rules football was his number-one sport. He attended McKinnon Secondary College and played his junior career with the Ormond Football Club. In 2009, he played with the Sandringham Dragons in the TAC Cup and played the first three matches of the year before tearing his anterior cruciate ligament (ACL) in the match against the Geelong Falcons at Skilled Stadium. He was initially selected in Victoria Metro's squad for the 2009 AFL Under-18 Championships, but he missed the entire championships due to his knee injury.

AFL career

2010–2013: Early years and ongoing injury
Gawn was recruited by the Melbourne Football Club with their fifth selection and thirty-fourth overall in the 2009 national draft. At the time of the draft, he was the second-tallest player in the league, at 208 cm, behind Aaron Sandilands at 211 cm. After undergoing surgery in 2009 to repair his ACL, he missed the majority of the 2010 season. He played a few matches at the end of the season for Melbourne's affiliate team, the Casey Scorpions, in the Victorian Football League (VFL) development league. After strong performances in the VFL for Casey in the first half of 2011, he made his AFL debut in the 33-point win against  at the Melbourne Cricket Ground in Round 11, where he played primarily as a forward and recorded eight disposals, ten hitouts and two behinds. For his debut match, he had the number 37 jumper presented to him by 1991 Brownlow Medallist, Australian Football and Melbourne hall of famer, Jim Stynes, who wore the same guernsey number in his first season. He played in the next two matches before being omitted for the round fourteen match. He returned to the senior side for the 76-point loss against  at the Melbourne Cricket Ground in Round 20, but he was dropped the next week and managed just four matches in his debut season.

During the 2012 pre-season, Gawn suffered a knee injury, which was initially suspected as a meniscus tear in his right knee, but it was ultimately a tear in both his meniscus and ACL, which forced him to miss the entire 2012 season. He had a delayed start to the 2013 season when he suffered a hamstring injury during the pre-season, and he was placed on the long-term injury list in January. He played his first match in 18 months when he played for Casey in a VFL pre-season match in late March. He played his first AFL match for the season in Round 4, where he kicked two final-quarter goals to help Melbourne defeat  by 41 points at the Melbourne Cricket Ground when they were down by three goals at three-quarter time. He played the next five matches before being omitted for the Round 10 match against . He played seven of the remaining ten matches for the season and finished with 13 in total.

2014–2016: Improvement, breakout and first All-Australian selection

During the 2014 season, along with playing for Melbourne, Gawn returned to his junior club, the Ormond Football Club, to co-coach their division two team in the Victorian Amateur Football Association (VAFA). He also began a carpentry business called Max Jones & Co alongside then-Melbourne teammates, Matt Jones and Max King, producing tables. He played his first AFL match for the year in the seventeen point win against  at the Melbourne Cricket Ground in round nine. In July, whilst playing for Casey in the VFL, he amassed eighty hitouts against  which broke the record for the most hitouts in a VFL match. He played in the final four AFL matches of the season finishing with nine in total. He suffered a knee injury in the final match of the year against  at Etihad Stadium, although he avoided an ACL tear, he still required surgery for the third time on his right knee. His season with the Casey Scorpions, in which he played eight matches, was rewarded with the Gardner Clark Medal for the club best and fairest and the Broadbridge Medal, which is awarded to the best Melbourne-listed player at Casey. At the end of the season he switched guernsey numbers from 37 to 11, the same numbers Melbourne hall of famer and former ruckman, Jim Stynes, wore during his career.

Gawn played in the VFL for the Casey Scorpions in the first half of the 2015 VFL season, before playing his first senior match for the 2015 AFL season in the 25-point loss against  at the Melbourne Cricket Ground in the annual Queen's Birthday clash in Round 10. In his third match for the season, he helped Melbourne secure a 24-point win against  at Simonds Stadium in Round 12, the club's first win in Geelong since 2005, where he recorded 44 hitouts, 19 disposals, eight marks (six contested), five tackles and a goal. He was highly praised for the match in which the media called it the best match of his career to that point; he also earned the maximum three Brownlow votes for the match. He did not miss a match for the remainder of the season, playing thirteen in total, and he was labelled the most improved ruckman in the league for the season by Fox Sports Australia journalist Ben Waterworth. He was rated as an elite tap ruckman by Champion Data, winning 49 percent of contests, and elite for marks and intercept marks by a ruckman. In November, he signalled his intentions to become the best ruckman in the AFL.

After strong form in the 2016 pre-season, Gawn was added to Melbourne's leadership group. In the Round 3 match against North Melbourne at Blundstone Arena, he lined up against the 2015 All-Australian ruckman, Todd Goldstein; the contest drew high attention from the media, in which Gawn recorded 63 hitouts, the fourth-highest total for an AFL match at the time. His rise in the first half of the 2016 season led commentators to question whether he had become the best ruckman in the league and if he would be the All-Australian ruckman. In the Queen's Birthday game, Melbourne recorded a 46-point win against Collingwood at the Melbourne Cricket Ground; Gawn was awarded the Neale Daniher trophy as the best player on the ground, in which he recorded a career-best 27 disposals, along with three goals, six marks and 31 hitouts.

Apart from his tapwork, Gawn's ability to kick goals and take contested marks drew the attention of the media with many predicting he would be the All-Australian ruckman after his form continued in the second half of the season. In particular, his match in the twenty-nine-point win against  in round twenty, where he recorded eight contested marks, which saw Hawthorn coach, Alastair Clarkson, note that "his second half was one of the best halves of footy by a ruckman [he'd] seen in a long time". Fox Sports Australia journalist, Tom Morris, noted in August that Gawn had achieved his goal of becoming the best ruckman in the competition set the previous November. His rapid rise saw him move from 295th at the start of the season to twelfth at the end of the home and away season in the AFL official player ratings. He played all matches for the season and finished with the most hitouts in the league with 928 and averaged 42.2 per game, he also broke the record for the most hit-outs to advantage in a season with 314.

Gawn was named in the AFL Media team of the week eight times, and his season was ultimately rewarded with selection in the 2016 All-Australian team as the ruckman. Furthermore, he was named in the AFL Media team of the year, the AFL Coaches Association team of the year and several commentators within the industry teams of the year, including Herald Sun head of football writer, Mark Robinson's; The Age journalist Rohan Connolly's; and former players, Jonathan Brown's and Cameron Mooney's. After heading into the best and fairest as the heavy favourite, he ultimately finished third behind Jack Viney and Nathan Jones, winning the Ron Barassi Senior Memorial Trophy in addition to the Norm Smith Memorial Trophy (coaches award) and James McDonald Trophy (heart and spirit award). Furthermore, he was the highest-polling ruckman in the Brownlow Medal count and Melbourne's highest-polling player, scoring 16 votes.

2017–present: Injury and comeback

After Gawn's All-Australian year in 2016, external expectations on him were high, especially with the third-man ruck rule change—whereby only the two nominated ruckman were allowed to compete in the ruck—with Fox Footy personality and former player, David King, saying Gawn would relish in the rule change and "take his game to another level." Furthermore, he was named inside the top twenty players heading into the 2017 season by AFL Media and was touted as "undoubtedly one of the game’s finest and most influential players" by Fox Sports Australia's Riley Beveridge. His season was recognised internally too as he was retained in Melbourne's leadership group for the 2017 season.

In the opening round match against  at Etihad Stadium, Gawn recorded 49 hitouts and led Melbourne to the 30-point win, according to the Herald Sun's Lauren Wood. The Age journalist Rohan Connolly furthered this notion by saying Gawn's dominance over St Kilda ruckman Tom Hickey was crucial in the victory with his service leading to winning the clearance count. He was named in AFL Media's team of the week, and AFL Media's Nathan Schmook stated Gawn would have a dominant season based on his performance in the opening round. He played the first three matches of the year before sustaining a serious hamstring injury during the second quarter of the 29-point loss against Geelong at Etihad Stadium in Round 3; the injury required surgery and he was initially ruled out for 12 weeks. He ultimately missed ten weeks of football and returned directly to the AFL in the three-point win against  at Domain Stadium in Round 14.

Following his return from injury, Gawn struggled to recapture his form from the previous season and early in the season, and by his own admission, he said that he wasn't back to the speed of the game due to his long-term injury. In addition, his form was further affected when his ruck technique was scrutinised by the field umpires during the twenty-four-point win against St Kilda at the Melbourne Cricket Ground in round twenty-one, in which he was giving away several free kicks for which "[Gawn] had never given away in [his] life" and he consequently conceded ruck contests so he wouldn't give away free kicks. After the head of umpiring, Hayden Kennedy, explained "if there is a straight arm by one of the players, when the other player is contesting the footy, that's when it becomes a free kick," Gawn was forced to adapt his ruck technique. He played every match following his return from injury to finish with thirteen matches and signed a contract extension in October, tying him to the club until the end of 2021.

He played every match in 2018, including three finals, to finish with 25 matches for the season; his season was rewarded with his first club best and fairest winning the Keith 'Bluey' Truscott Trophy with 657 votes.
In the lead up to the 2021 finals series, Melbourne needed to defeat Geelong at their home ground. After trailing by as much as seven goals, Gawn led the comeback which culminated in a mark and shot at goal after the siren to give Melbourne the minoir Premiership (top of the ladder after 23 rounds)

On September 25 2021, Gawn captained Melbourne to its first AFL Premiership in 57 years.

Statistics
Updated to the end of the 2022 season.

|-
| 2010 ||  || 37
| 0 || — || — || — || — || — || — || — || — || — || — || — || — || — || — || — || — || —
|- 
| 2011 ||  || 37
| 4 || 1 || 2 || 15 || 14 || 29 || 12 || 12 || 65 || 0.3 || 0.5 || 3.8 || 3.5 || 7.3 || 3.0 || 3.0 || 16.3 || 0
|-
| 2012 ||  || 37
| 0 || — || — || — || — || — || — || — || — || — || — || — || — || — || — || — || — || —
|- 
| 2013 ||  || 37
| 13 || 7 || 2 || 48 || 68 || 116 || 38 || 31 || 242 || 0.5 || 0.2 || 3.7 || 5.2 || 8.9 || 2.9 || 2.4 || 18.6 || 0
|-
| 2014 ||  || 37
| 9 || 4 || 5 || 39 || 56 || 95 || 38 || 11 || 133 || 0.4 || 0.6 || 4.4 || 6.2 || 10.6 || 4.2 || 1.2 || 14.8 || 0
|- 
| 2015 ||  || 11
| 13 || 6 || 4 || 72 || 104 || 176 || 58 || 29 || 485 || 0.5 || 0.3 || 5.5 || 8.0 || 13.5 || 4.5 || 2.2 || 37.3 || 4
|-
| 2016 ||  || 11
| 22 || 16 || 11 || 154 || 164 || 318 || 91 || 80 || bgcolor=CAE1FF | 928† || 0.7 || 0.5 || 7.0 || 7.5 || 14.5 || 4.1 || 3.6 || bgcolor=CAE1FF | 42.2† || 16
|- 
| 2017 ||  || 11
| 13 || 4 || 4 || 77 || 83 || 160 || 46 || 36 || 466 || 0.3 || 0.3 || 5.9 || 6.4 || 12.3 || 3.5 || 2.8 || 35.8 || 3
|-
| 2018 ||  || 11
| 25 || 13 || 12 || 204 || 192 || 396 || 113 || 57 || bgcolor=CAE1FF | 1119† || 0.5 || 0.5 || 8.2 || 7.7 || 15.8 || 4.5 || 2.3 || bgcolor=CAE1FF | 44.8† || 20
|- 
| 2019 ||  || 11
| 21 || 7 || 7 || 253 || 119 || 372 || 102 || 51 || 829 || 0.3 || 0.3 || 12.0 || 5.7 || 17.7 || 4.9 || 2.4 || 39.5 || 17
|-
| 2020 ||  || 11
| 14 || 1 || 1 || 142 || 80 || 222 || 63 || 35 || 458 || 0.1 || 0.1 || 10.1 || 5.7 || 15.9 || 4.5 || 2.5 || bgcolor=CAE1FF | 32.7† || 13
|-
| scope=row bgcolor=F0E68C | 2021# ||  || 11
| 25 || 16 || 17 || 316 || 147 || 463 || 131 || 71 ||  bgcolor=CAE1FF | 804† || 0.6 || 0.7 || 12.6 || 5.9 || 18.5 || 5.2 || 2.8 || 32.2 || 16
|-
| 2022 ||  || 11
| 22 || 13 || 14 || 287 || 130 || 417 || 122 || 40 || 596 || 0.6 || 0.6 || 13.0 || 5.9 || 19.0 || 5.5 || 1.8 || 27.1 || 12
|- class=sortbottom
! colspan=3 | Career
! 181 !! 88 !! 79 !! 1607 !! 1157 !! 2764 !! 814 !! 454 !! 6125 !! 0.5 !! 0.4 !! 8.9 !! 6.4 !! 15.3 !! 4.5 !! 2.5 !! 33.8 !! 101
|}

Notes

Honours and achievements
Team
 AFL premiership player: 2021 (c)
 McClelland Trophy: 2021 (c)

Individual
 AFL premiership captain: 2021
 Melbourne captain: 2020–
 AFLCA Champion Player of the Year Award: 2018
 6× All-Australian team: 2016, 2018, 2019, 2020, 2021 (c), 2022 
 2× Keith 'Bluey' Truscott Trophy: 2018, 2019
 Neale Daniher Trophy: 2016

References

External links

Melbourne Football Club players
Living people
1991 births
Australian rules footballers from Melbourne
Sandringham Dragons players
Ormond Amateur Football Club players
Casey Demons players
Australian people of New Zealand descent
All-Australians (AFL)
Keith 'Bluey' Truscott Trophy winners
Melbourne Football Club Premiership players
One-time VFL/AFL Premiership players